Sergio Gómez Martín (born 4 September 2000) is a Spanish professional footballer who plays as a left-back and attacking midfielder for Premier League club Manchester City.

Club career

Barcelona 
Born in Badalona, Barcelona, Catalonia, Gómez joined FC Barcelona's youth setup in 2010, after stints at CF Trajana-PB Sant Just, CF Badalona and RCD Espanyol. After progressing through the youth setup, he made his senior debut with the reserves on 6 January 2018, coming on as a late substitute for Abel Ruiz in a 1–1 away draw against Real Zaragoza in the Segunda División.

Borussia Dortmund 
On 30 January 2018, Gómez signed with Bundesliga side Borussia Dortmund. He initially played with the team's U19 side before joining the senior squad, with a scheduled start date of 1 July 2019. He made his debut for the senior squad on 8 April 2018 in 3–0 Bundesliga win against VfB Stuttgart.

Huesca (loan)
Gómez joined Spanish second division club SD Huesca on loan for the 2019–20 season on 12 August 2019. On 1 September of the following year, after helping in the club's promotion to La Liga, his loan was extended for a further campaign.

Anderlecht 
On 30 June 2021, Gómez signed for Belgian club Anderlecht on a permanent transfer, signing a contract until 2025. at the end of his first season in Belgium, Gómez made 49 appearances for Anderlecht across all competitions and was named the club's player of the season.

Manchester City 
Gómez moved to Manchester City on a permanent transfer on 16 August 2022, signing a contract until 2026. On 27 August, Gómez made his City debut as a substitute for Erling Haaland in a 4–2 home league victory over Crystal Palace. He made his Champions League debut against Sevilla on 6 September 2022.

Career statistics

Club

Honours
Barcelona Youth
UEFA Youth League: 2017–18 

Huesca
Segunda División: 2019–20

Spain U17
UEFA European Under-17 Championship: 2017
FIFA Under-17 World Cup runner-up: 2017

Spain U18
Mediterranean Games Gold Medal: 2018

Spain U19
UEFA European Under-19 Championship: 2019

Individual
FIFA U-17 World Cup Silver Ball: 2017
Anderlecht Player of the Season: 2021–22

References

External links 

2000 births
Living people
People from Badalona
Sportspeople from the Province of Barcelona
Spanish footballers
Footballers from Catalonia
Association football midfielders
La Liga players
Segunda División players
FC Barcelona Atlètic players
SD Huesca footballers
Bundesliga players
Borussia Dortmund II players
Borussia Dortmund players
Belgian Pro League players
R.S.C. Anderlecht players
Manchester City F.C. players
Premier League players
Spain youth international footballers
Spain under-21 international footballers
Competitors at the 2018 Mediterranean Games
Mediterranean Games gold medalists for Spain
Mediterranean Games medalists in football
Spanish expatriate footballers
Expatriate footballers in Germany
Spanish expatriate sportspeople in Germany
Expatriate footballers in Belgium
Spanish expatriate sportspeople in Belgium
Expatriate footballers in England
Spanish expatriate sportspeople in England